Sylvia's Restaurant of Harlem, often called Sylvia's Soul Food or just Sylvia's, is a soul food restaurant located at 328 Lenox Avenue, between 126th and 127th Streets, in Harlem, Manhattan, New York City. It was founded in 1962 by Sylvia Woods. It has since expanded to a much larger space at its present location, and an adjacent building. The restaurant also sells a line of prepared foods, beauty and skin care items, cookbooks, and a children's book written by Woods.  Woods purchased the original luncheonette by borrowing money from her mother, who had to mortgage her farm to provide it.

The restaurant attracts a clientele that ranges from Harlem locals to visiting celebrities. Whoopi Goldberg, Bill Clinton, Nelson Mandela, Caroline Kennedy, Jesse Jackson, Al Sharpton, Magic Johnson, Barack Obama, Bernie Sanders and Bruno Mars are among those who have dined there. Sylvia's was also featured on a Manhattan-themed episode of the Travel Channel's Man v. Food in early 2009. On September 19, 2007, commentator Bill O'Reilly received criticism regarding comments he made on his syndicated radio show, about having lunch at Sylvia's with Al Sharpton. O'Reilly  concluded that stereotypes regarding African Americans were not true based on observations he had made at the restaurant.

In response to the COVID-19 pandemic, Sylvia's Restaurant participated in relief efforts by donating fifty meals to Harlem Hospital. The restaurant announced plans to open a pop-up pantry featuring meal kits to serve the community.

See also 
 List of restaurants in New York City
 List of soul food restaurants

References

External links 
 

Restaurants established in 1962
Restaurants in Manhattan
Harlem
Soul food restaurants in the United States
1962 establishments in New York City